The Lai languages or Pawih/Pawi languages are various Central Kuki-Chin-Mizo languages spoken by the Lai people or Pawi. They include “ Laiṭong” (Falam-Chin) spoken in Falam district, Laiholh (Hakha-Chin) spoken around the Haka (Hakha/Halkha) capital of Chin State in Burma (Myanmar) and in the Lawngtlai district of Mizoram, India. In Bangladesh, a related language is spoken by the Bawm people. Other Lai languages are Mi-E (including Khualsim), and the Zokhua dialect of Hakha Lai spoken in Zokhua village.

Lai languages are mainly used in central townships of Chin State which include Hakha, Falam, Matupi and Thantlang. Although Hakha Lai dialect is not a tonal language, it shares the majority of its vocabulary with Falam Lai. Therefore, it is intelligible between Falam Lai and Hakha Lai. Falam Lai language is very close to its sibling Mizo language, chiefly used in Mizoram state India. Due to its closeness to the Mizo language, Falam Lai language vocabularies have been seen quite common in Mizo language. It is probably due to history that some of Mizo have been living in the west part of Chin State before they migrated to the current Mizoram. History also said that the Mizo language is derived from the Zahau (Lai) language.

History 

According to Thomas Han Tai, British soldier Lieutenant R. Steward Hudson developed the first writing system of Chin dialects in 1857 AD.

Lai language is written with the Roman alphabet. D.J.C. MacNabb, B.Sc., political officer in Haka, wrote the first Lai language writing handbook, "The Handbook of Haka or Baungshe Dialect of Chin Language," printed by Superintendent, Government Printing Press, Rangoon, in 1891. In 1894 Surgeon Major A.G.E Newland (IMS) redeveloped the Lai writing system and published a book called "A Practical Hand Book of the Lais as spoken by the Hakas and other allied tribes of the Chin Hills (Commonly the Baungshe dialect)," printed by the Superintendent, Government Printing, Burma, 1897. Later, the first Chin Hill missionaries Rev. Arthur E. Carson and Laura Carson arrived in Haka on 15 March 1899. With the arrival of Rev. Dr. Tilbe in 1900 in Haka, he and Rev. Arthur Carson researched the Lai writing system developed by Major A.G.E Newland. Still, the latest version of the Lai writing system is far from perfection.

Examples of Lai writing system developed by Rev. Arthur Carson and Rev. Dr. Tilbe:
 Lai Relnak Tsa Ok
 A zhul Tu An Twa Hser Nak
 Hla Tsa Ok

In modern writing:
 Lai Relnak Cauk
 A Zultu An Tuahsernak

In 1908, Rev. Joseph Herbert Cope and his wife arrived in Haka city and revamped the Lai writing system. After Rev. Dr. Chester U Strait and his wife arrived in Haka in 1925, they upgraded the Hakha Lai writing system to almost perfection. Thus, when the last American Baptist Missionary Rev. Dr. Robert G. Johnson and his wife arrived in Haka in 1947, there were not many errors to fix and redevelop. Therefore, they translated the Holy Bible into Hakha Lai language in accordance with the Lai grammar finalized by Dr. Cope and Dr. Strait.

Grammar
Lai grammar (Hakha Lai: adinginzirnák) is the study of the morphology and syntax of the various Lai languages, a Kuki-Chin language spoken in the Indian subcontinent and Southeast Asia. Given that Lai has many forms, for example Hakha Lai and Thantlang Lai, it is important to note that the grammar discussed below applies only to the Hakha dialect of Lai. Lai is an agglutinative language with moderate amounts of fusionality and some analytic elements. Its synthetic nature allows for free word order, although the dominant arrangements are usually subject-object-verb (SOV) and subject-verb-object (SVO). There are various definite articles but no indefinite articles. Subject pronouns are often dropped and to a lesser extent object pronouns.

Verbs
Lai verbs are moderately inflected and are highly irregular with many exceptions. They consist of a stem or base and various conjugation endings indicating person, tense, aspect, mood, and more. One way for fusional inflection in verbs is through a process known as stem alternation (Hakha Lai: Hleitîrnak). Each verb has at least two stems, formally named stem I, stem II, and so on. Each stem differs from each other by apophony, their vowel length, consonant voicing or devoicing, adding a consonant or entirely changing the lexicon. Since there has not been extensive research done in Lai, verbs have yet to be grouped into classes. An example of a typical person conjugation is shown below:

Stem I

The stem vowel -á- is shortened to -a- to get the stem -ap-. This is a very common alternation found in many day-to-day verbs.

Stem II

Deletion of the final consonant can be observed here in stem II. However, this is irregular as most verbs usually revive or gain a consonant in stem II. This stem is used to indicate the distant future tense, subjunctive mood, cohortative mood, hortative mood, jussive mood and more.

Dialects of Lai 

The language used in Falam township is called Lai ṭong and is used as a lingua franca by the peoples of tribes inhabiting Falam. It is used as the standard dialect in Burmese and Chin media programs. Lai ṭong is derived from Laimi and țong where Laimi means the locals and țong meaning language.

There are many languages and dialects found in Chin state, each with their own peculiarities and similarities to others. The Falam dialect has the most cognates to other languages and has the simplest grammar, making it popular among the tribes. This was made possible through the geographic location of the town where Falam is spoken. Falam township is in the center of Chin state, just north of another populous township, Halkha. The dialect has been influenced by various tribes inhabiting the area and other tribes who come to trade and serve in the area. It was recognized as the official language of Chinland during the British colonial era and continued to serve as a lingua franca until the military junta disallowed it to be taught in the 1960s. The popularity of Falam can also be attributed to Falam Basic Education High School being the first public school in Chin State. Before higher education was available in all parts of Chin State, residents from near and far would have to attend school in Falam. This resulted in many students having to adapt to the community and subsequently the Falam lai language.

The emergence of terminology of Hakha Lai is one of the reason where Lai language is more diversified than as known. CACC calls it Hakha station language. Unlike other dialects, Baungshe is not a tonal language. That's the reason why the accent or tone of Baungshe dialect speakers differs from township to township and village to village. Therefore, the orthography, phonology and some the vocabularies used in one township may not be used in other townships. However, there is almost no discrepancy of vocabularies between Hakha Lai used in capital Haka / Hakha, Matupi and Thantlang townships. Matupi town has its own dialect known Matuholh or Matu Lai. It is the next kin of Hakha Lai. The Bible in Matu language has been successfully translated by Rev. Chan Thleng from Matupi. He is both expert in Matu and Hakha Lai. However, due to a very poor transportation and communication between Hakha and Matupi, the Hakha Lai influence and progress in Matupi is weak.

Academic Perspective of Lai 

From an academic perspective, Falam Lai and Haka Lai are both Lai languages. Even with their linguistic variations, the languages should be studied together, because they are closely interrelated. Lai languages are probably the richest among dialects in the Chin State. Due to the research of Lai experts in the Chin State, a very interesting flow of adjectives and adverbs has been discovered, paving the way for a better understanding of Lai grammar. Despite this, much of the structure of these languages is still unknown, and they are still under debate by linguistic experts.

References

Stephen Ni Kio, Lai Nunphung.
Hakha Lai - By David A. Peterson, Chapter Twenty Five.
Kenneth VanBik, Three Types Of Causative Instruction In Hakha Lai, University of California, Berkeley.
VanBik, David (1986) English–Chin (Haka) Dictionary, Haka.
Haye-Neave, D.R. (1948) Lai Chin grammar and dictionary, Rangoon: Superintendent of Government Printing and Stationery, Burma.
George Bedell, AGREEMENT IN MIZO - Papers from the Eleventh Annual Meeting of the Southeast Asian Linguistics Society, Tempe, Arizona: Program for Southeast Asian Studies, Arizona State University, pp. 51–70, 2001.
George Bedell, AGREEMENT IN LAI - Papers from the Fifth Annual Meeting of the Southeast Asian Linguistics Society, Tempe, Arizona: Program for Southeast Asian Studies, Arizona State University, pp. 21–32, 1995.

Languages of Mizoram
Lawngtlai district